Roger Federer and Olivier Rochus were the defending champions, but they did not compete in the Junior's this year.

Guillermo Coria and David Nalbandian defeated Todor Enev and Jarkko Nieminen in the final, 7–5, 6–4 to win the boys' doubles tennis title at the 1999 Wimbledon Championships.

Seeds

  Guillermo Coria /  David Nalbandian (champions)
  José de Armas /  Daniel Langre (semifinals)
  Jürgen Melzer /  Kristian Pless (quarterfinals)
  Julien Benneteau /  Nicolas Mahut (quarterfinals)
  Lee Childs /  Simon Dickson (quarterfinals)
  Joachim Johansson /  Lovro Zovko (second round)
  Ladislav Chramosta /  Jakub Hašek (second round)
  Todd Martin /  Jean-Julien Rojer (quarterfinals)

Draw

Finals

Top half

Bottom half

References

External links

Boys' Doubles
Wimbledon Championship by year – Boys' doubles